Red roof may refer to:

 Red Roof Inn, a motel chain
 Red roofs, a short film in the Israeli pastiche Yellow Asphalt
 "Red Roof", corporate headquarters of the American company Wawa